Bilger is a surname. Notable people with the surname include:

Audrey Bilger, American academic administrator
Camille Bilger (1879-1947), French politician
Grace Bilger (1907-2000), American painter
Leonora Bilger (1893–1975), American chemist
Pierre Bilger (1940-2011), French businessman
Steffen Bilger (born 1979), German politician

References